Tarong is a national park in Queensland, Australia, 137 km northwest of Brisbane.

See also

 Protected areas of Queensland

References 

National parks of Queensland
Protected areas established in 1995
Wide Bay–Burnett
South Burnett Region